Indonesia International Institute for Life Sciences also known as i3L (in Indonesia: Institut Bio Scientia Indonesia), is a private university in Indonesia. The main campus of the university is at Jakarta. The campus was established with collaboration of Karolinska Institute and Swedish University of Agricultural Sciences.

The university has two faculties; School of Life Sciences, and School of Business (also known as i3L School of Business or iSB). First established for seven bachelor's degree program, it has currently expand to delivers ten bachelor's degree programs (six in School of Life Sciences and four in School of Business), one pathway program in Business, and one master's degree program.

Academic Faculties 
The university has two faculties to support both research and teaching activities.

Faculty of Life Sciences 

 Biomedicine
 Bioinformatics
 Biotechnology
 Food Science and Nutrition
 Food Technology
 Pharmacy

Faculty of Business 

 Business and Entrepreneurship
 International Business Management
 International Business Management in International Applied Accounting
 International Business Management in Creative Digital Marketing
 International Pathway Program in Business
 Master in Biomanagement

Academic Ranking

Ranking 
Indonesia International Institute for Life Sciences (i3L) is ranked at The Top 100 nationwide by the 2021 Overall Sinta Score awarded by Lembaga Layanan Pendidikan Tinggi (LLDIKTI), a work unit under the Directorate General of Higher Education, Ministry of Education, Culture, Research and Technology of the Republic of Indonesia.

International partnerships 
i3L has a number of agreements in place with many of its international peers, including: Swedish University of Agricultural Sciences (SLU), University of California, Davis (UCDAVIS),Deakin University, Australia, University of Queensland, Australia, University of Dundee, United Kingdom, and Boston University, USA

See also 

 List of universities in Indonesia

References

External links 

i3L – Official site of i3L
 iSB – Official site of i3L School of Business

Universities in Indonesia